NEEMIC is a project initiated in 2011 by Amihan Zemp and Hans Martin Galliker based on the idea of involving high quality fashion, making the industry more environmentally sustainable, and building bridges between Europe and Asia. The project was conceived in May 2010 and began operations the following year. Their website began operations on October 14, 2011.

Information
Based in Beijing, NEEMIC collaborates with young designers from London to Tokyo creating a particular metropolitan aesthetic. They primarily use organic fabrics. NEEMIC is a member of  the Agrachina.com, a network aimed at promoting organic agriculture in China. The concept behind the agrachina group, is that world already has enough fabric but must find alternative ways to recycle the resources already at hand. The project uses leftovers of the textile industry, as well as recycled used clothing. Following the official launch of the project on October 23, 2012 the project received a domestic spotlight including media attention and collaboration with the Ethical Fashion Forum, Time Out Magazine, Lifestyle magazine, That's Beijing, Not Just A Label Reseller, Anyshopstyle.com, and various others.

References

NEEMIC inspires organic fashion movement in China
http://source.ethicalfashionforum.com/article/neemic-inspires-organic-fashion-movement-in-china

NEEMIC LAUNCHES ON ANYSHOPSTYLE.CN!*
http://www.anywearstyle.com/post/NEEMIC-‐LAUNCHES-‐ON-‐ANYSHOPSTYLE.CN!

China Radio International ‐ Designer, Künstler, Visionäre – Fusion von Tradition und Moderne in Dashilar - Hutong*
http://german.cri.cn/1833/2012/10/10/1s183577.htm

TimeOut Magazine - Design of the times‚ Urban Forest by NEEMIC‘ exhibition*
http://www.neemic.asia/press/clippings/TimeOut-magazine_September2012_UrbanForestImages.pdf
(pages 4/5, 36, 37)

LifeStyle Magazine -‐ Feature NEEMIC
http://www.neemic.asia/press/clippings/LifeStyle-magazine_March2012_FeatureNEEMIC.pdf

Chat with NEEMIC creative director Amihan Zemp
http://www.thatsmags.com/beijing/article/detail/866/chat-‐with-‐amihan-‐zemp

United Nations South-South Development Programme December 2012 newsletter - 2) Creating Green Fashion in China 
https://www.scribd.com/doc/119489975/Development-Challenges-South-South-Solutions-December-2012-Issue#outer_page_3

NOT JUST A LABEL Editorial - If one does not plow, there will be no harvest
http://www.notjustalabel.com/editorial/if_one_does_not_plow_there_will_be_no_harvest

Companies established in 2011
Companies based in Beijing